Nya hyss av Emil i Lönneberga is a 1972 Swedish film, the second of three films about the Emil i Lönneberga by Astrid Lindgren.

Cast

External links 
 
 

Swedish children's films
1970s Swedish-language films
1972 films
Films based on Emil of Lönneberga
Films directed by Olle Hellbom
1970s Swedish films